Centrifugal abdominal lipodystrophy is a skin condition characterized by areas of subcutaneous fat loss that slowly enlarge.

See also 
 Lipodystrophy
 List of cutaneous conditions
 Skin lesion

References 

Conditions of the subcutaneous fat